SA Derby may refer to the following horse racing events:

South Australian Derby
South African Derby
Santa Anita Derby